The following is a list of United States-related events predicted and scheduled to take place in 2024.

Elections 

The US general elections will be held on November 5 of this year. In the federal government, the offices of the president, vice president, all 435 seats of the House of Representatives, and roughly one third of the Senate. In this year's presidential election, Joe Biden is eligible to run for a second term, though with former president Donald Trump's declaration to run for the office again, the election may possibly be a rematch of the 2020 election. In the Senate, at least three seats, those of Senators Dianne Feinstein from California, Mike Braun from Indiana, and Debbie Stabenow from Michigan, will be open contests.

Concerning state governments, 11 states and 2 territories will hold gubernatorial elections, and most states and territories will hold elections for their legislatures. Many major cities, including Baltimore, Las Vegas, Honolulu, Milwaukee, Miami, Phoenix, San Diego, and San Francisco will also elect their mayors.

Predicted and scheduled events 

 January 1 – Assuming no changes are made to copyright law, books, films, and other works published in 1928 will enter the public domain. The most notable works entering into the public domain are Steamboat Willie, Walt Disney's first cartoon with synchronized sound, and the earliest versions of Mickey Mouse.
 February 11 – Super Bowl LVIII will be held in Las Vegas's Allegiant Stadium, a first for the city.
 February 18
 The Daytona 500 will run for the 64th time.
 The 2024 NBA All-Star Game will be held in Indianapolis.
 April 8 – A total solar eclipse will be viewable in the central and northeastern United States, with the path of total eclipse over parts of Texas, Oklahoma, Arkansas, Missouri, Illinois, Kentucky, Indiana, Ohio, Pennsylvania, New York, Vermont, New Hampshire, and Maine.
 May 26 – The 107th running of the Indianapolis 500 will be held.
 June 14–July 14 – The United States will host the 2024 Copa América.

Notes

References 

 
2020s in the United States
United States
United States
Years of the 21st century in the United States